Command Secondary Schools are secondary schools under the Nigerian Army Education corps (previously under the defunct Institute of Army Education).

Overview
The Directorate of Command Schools is directly responsible for administration. Command Schools may be regular day schools (known as Command Day Secondary School (CDSS)) or boarding schools (known as Command Secondary School (CSS)). There are a total of 45 Command schools, 30 of which are boarding schools and 15 are day schools.  Command schools were established as welfare schools to provide low cost, quality education to children of Nigerian army personnel while indoctrinating patriotism, civic responsibility and military discipline in attendees. Over time, admission requirements have been relaxed to allow the entry of students who are not wards or children of soldiers. However, civilian fees are much higher than fees for children of military and police personnel.

Command Schools maintain an affiliation with the Nigerian Military School (NMS), Nigerian Navy Secondary Schools and Nigerian Air Force Secondary Schools. Both Command schools and NMS are run by the Nigeria Army, however they have distinct aims. While NMS aims to produce military personnel, Command schools aim to produce a wider base of graduates including civilians who have strong national values. Howbeit, a significant portion of Command School graduates go on to join different branches of Nigerian Military. Command Schools are known for their quality of education and prominent alumni in the country. Command alumni informally known as ex-commandos often contribute to development projects in their alma mater.

Administrative Structure and Organization
Command Schools are run by the Nigerian Army Education Corps through the Directorate of Command Schools Services. Each Command School is headed by a Commandant who is an Army officer typically at the rank of Lt Col or Major, although the Commandant may rarely be a Colonel. The Commandant is directly assisted by two civilian officials, the vice-principal administrative and vice-principal academic as well as a military officer known as the administrative officer typically ranked as a Captain or 1st Lt.

The vice principal administrative (also known as VP admin) oversees administrative functions in the school including student enrollment, personnel administration, records, community engagement and student organization. The VP admin is aided by the assistant-vice-principal administrative (AVP admin). Other officers and officials reporting to the VP admin include the school regimental sergeant major, bursar, quartermaster, librarian, groundskeeper, janitor and bookshop manager.

The vice principal academic (also known as VP acad) deals with academic issues including curriculum development, teaching schedules, teacher evaluation, laboratory and workshop training, student discipline and development. The VP acad oversees two assistant-vice-principals academic for senior secondary school and junior secondary school, respectively known as 'AVP Snr Sch' and 'AVP Jnr Sch'. Other officials and officers reporting to the VP acad include heads of departments, education regimental sergeant major, military instructors and heads of clubs and societies.

The Administrative officer (AO) heads the military chain of command under the Commandant and is responsible for assisting the VP admin and VP acad. The AO is also directly responsible for school security, maintaining military discipline and supervising paramilitary and martial organizations (such as the Cadet corps) operating in the school. The AO oversees the quarter guard squads, RSMs and all other military personnel in the school.

The student body is led by a number of prefects who may be elected by students or appointed by the school's authorities. The selection of prefects and the number of varies with each individual command school. Typical prefect positions include head boy, head girl, assistant head boy, assistant head girl, labour prefects, laboratory prefects and time keepers. Prefects are usually required to have strong academic performances and adherence to military discipline. Starting in 2020, the use of chevrons were introduced to denote student ranking by class.

Student classes include JSS1 to JSS3 and SS1 to SS3. Each class is divided into a number of arms which varies with the population of students but is usually between 5 and 9. Arms are often named after precious stones and metals. Promotion is merit-based with students required to have a minimum of 5 credit passes including Mathematics and English to be promoted. This is the minimum requirement and individual schools may institute more stringent requirements. In practice, most schools require up to 7 credit passes in Junior secondary schools. Promotion results are obtained by averaging performance across all three terms of the academic year. Students who do not meet the set requirements may be promoted on trial with the caveat that they must demonstrate strong performance in the subsequent term, or they would be demoted back to the previous class. Students who fail to get promotion in back-to-back academic years are withdrawn from the school. Promotion to Senior Secondary school requires 5 passes in Basic Education Certificate Examination. Throughout their education at the school, all students are required to take classes in the English language and at least one local or foreign language (including hausa, Igbo, Yoruba, French, and Arabic).

Senior secondary school students are assigned to arms in one of the four areas science, technology and engineering, arts and social sciences, and commerce based on performance in the Basic Education Certificate Examination and the guidance and counseling department's assessment of students' aptitudes. However, students may request to be assigned to a different class if this is approved by their parents. Science students take subjects preparing students for tertiary education in the sciences including Physics, Biology, Chemistry and Mathematics. Technology and engineering students form a large group of paths towards further engineering or, polytechnic education or apprenticeship in a trade or craft. Technology subjects may include Mathematics, Further Mathematics, Physics, Chemistry, Biology, Technical Drawing, Animal husbandry and fishery, Metal work, Catering craft, and wood work. Arts and social sciences aim to prepare students for further education in the creative arts and humanities. Arts subjects include Literature-in-English, Government, History, Economics, Geography, Religious Studies and Fine Arts. Commerce students are trained towards education and careers in business, finance and clerical work. Commercial subjects include Marketing, Bookkeeping and Accounts, Economics, Commerce and Office practice. Promotion from SS2 to SS3 is determined by performance in the Joint Command and NMS examination administered by the Nigerian Army Education Corps. Consequently, student transfers into the SS3 class at a Command School are only accepted for students transferring from another Command school, NMS, Air Force Secondary School or Nigerian navy Secondary School. At the end of Senior School, Students sit for either or both of the West African Senior School Certificate Examination and National Examination Council Senior School Certificate Examination.

List of Command Schools

Extra curricular activities
Command Schools believe strongly in the development of students who are 'academically and physically fit'. Schools are usually sited on land that leaves plenty of green space for outdoor activities. Students are required to participate in some extracurricular activities and are strongly encouraged to participate in others.

Inter-house sports
Students are divided into houses which are named after Nigerian Army divisions and the house shares its flag with the corresponding division. In boarding schools, the house is usually the same as the name of residences. For instance students in Tiger house would live in Tiger Hall/Hostel/Dormitory.

Inter-house sports cover a variety of track and field and ball sports including short and middle-distance races, high jump, long jump, triple jump, pole vault, javelin, discus, shot put, weightlifting basketball, football, volleyball, handball, tennis, table tennis, calisthenics, karate, wrestling, Floor gymnastics taekwondo, parade drill, draughts, and Ayo. Inter-house sports are usually festive events and students may play several other unofficial games including games of tag, pond-surfing, and temporary shelter building.

Educational technology adoption 
On 9-April-2022, Nigeria army partnered and adopted an education technology solution "SchoolTry" to discontinue the use of paper to gather information across all the command schools in Nigeria. The solution also serves as a learning management tool for students of the to learn both from home and in class, for parents to monitor their children's academic performance and progress and lastly for teachers to be able to facilitate the process of teaching and information dissemination.

Inter-school games
Command Schools usually match off against each other in a set of competitions called the Inter-Command games. The games typically have the same type of events as the inter-house sports. Sometimes the NMS may enter a team for the games. Command School schools also participate in sporting events in their local government, state or region.

Clubs, societies and martial organizations
Students are typically required to be registered members of at least one club or society. Clubs and societies carry out activities in a given area of interest. Sometimes clubs and societies may be affiliated with larger national or international bodies. Common clubs and societies include Red Cross, Junior Engineers, Technicians and Scientists Club, Literary and Debating Society, Young farmers club, Karate club, Taekwondo Dojo, and basketball club.

Other competitions
Command schools frequently participate in spelling bees, STEM competitions and exhibitions, debates, arts exhibitions, essay writing competitions amongst others.

Cadet Corps
The cadet corps is a youth paramilitary organization which has the stated goal of promoting leadership development and community engagement among Nigeria youths. Command students are encouraged to join the cadet corps. Cadet members are trained in parade drill and survival skills.

References

Schools in Nigeria

Military schools in Nigeria

Secondary schools in Nigeria